Sami Suleiman Soroor Al-Abdullah (born 8 January 1967) is a Qatari sprinter. He competed in the 4 × 400 metres relay at the 1992 Summer Olympics and the 1996 Summer Olympics.

References

External links

1967 births
Living people
Athletes (track and field) at the 1992 Summer Olympics
Athletes (track and field) at the 1996 Summer Olympics
Qatari male sprinters
Olympic athletes of Qatar
Place of birth missing (living people)
Asian Games medalists in athletics (track and field)
Asian Games silver medalists for Qatar
Athletes (track and field) at the 1990 Asian Games
Athletes (track and field) at the 1998 Asian Games
Medalists at the 1990 Asian Games